The 1998 Men's Ice Hockey World Championships was the 62nd such event sanctioned by the International Ice Hockey Federation (IIHF). Teams representing 40 countries participated in several levels of competition. The competition also served as qualifications for group placements in the 1999 competition.

World Championship Group A

The Championship took place between sixteen teams in Switzerland.

 (2nd, Qualification Tournament)
 (Promoted from Group B)

 (Far East Qualifier)
 (1st, Qualification Tournament)

 (Host)

World Championship Group B (Slovenia)
Played April 15–26 in Ljubljana and Jesenice.  Norway, as the next year's host, had already been awarded a spot in Group A.  In addition, the top three other finishers advanced to qualifying tournaments for inclusion in Group A.  The Estonians came into the final game knowing they could lose by four and still advance.  Trailing by three after two, they hung on to edge the Danish team in the standings.

Ukraine, Slovenia, and Estonia all advanced to qualifiers for Group A, the Netherlands was relegated to Group C.  Norway was promoted to Group A as hosts.

World Championship Group C (Hungary)
Played March 22–28 in Budapest, Székesfehérvár and Dunaújváros.

First Round

Group 1

Group 2

Final Round 25–28 Place 

Hungary was promoted to Group B.

Consolation Round 29–32 Place 

Spain was relegated to Group D.  The Spanish led by two in both their final games, but tied them, and their earlier loss to South Korea sealed their fate.

World Championship Group D (South Africa)
Played March 27 to April 2 in Krugersdorp and Pretoria.

First Round

Group 1

Group 2

Final Round 33–36 Place 

Bulgaria was promoted to Group C.

Consolation Round 37–40 Place

Citations

References
Complete results

Archive Switzerland 1998

See also
1998 World Junior Ice Hockey Championships

Men's World Ice Hockey Championships
IIHF Men's World Ice Hockey Championships